Farm Lake is a lake in Lake County, in the U.S. state of Minnesota.

Farm Lake was named from the fact the Ojibwe Indians planted their crops there.

See also
List of lakes in Minnesota

References

Lakes of Minnesota
Lakes of Lake County, Minnesota